Andrei Anatolyevich Netunayev (born 5 September 1960) is a former Russian football player.

References

1960 births
Living people
Soviet footballers
FC Okean Nakhodka players
Russian footballers
Russian Premier League players
Association football defenders